Karen Weekly is an American softball coach who is the current head coach at Tennessee. Weekly has previously been the co-head softball coach at Chattanooga from 1997–2001. She served as an assistant at both Chattanooga (1995–1996) and Pacific Lutheran (1987–1994).

Early life and education
Weekly attended college at Pacific Lutheran University, where she played softball from 1985 to 1987. She earned her juris doctor degree from University of Washington School of Law in 1990.

Coaching career

Pacific Lutheran (assistant)

Chattanooga

Tennessee

Head coaching record

College
References:

* – Karen Weekly was served as interim head coach at Chattanooga instead of Co-HC during Ralph Weekly's Leave of Absence.

References

Living people
Female sports coaches
American softball coaches
Pacific Lutheran Lutes softball coaches
Chattanooga Mocs softball coaches
Tennessee Volunteers softball coaches
Pacific Lutheran Lutes softball players
Year of birth missing (living people)